Five ships of the Royal Navy have been named HMS Serapis, after the god Serapis of Hellenistic Egypt.

  was a 44-gun  two-decker fifth rate launched in 1779 and captured later that year by the American John Paul Jones. She became a French privateer and was lost to a fire in 1781.
  was a 44-gun fifth rate, launched in 1782, converted to a storeship in 1795, and sold at Jamaica in 1826.
  was an iron screw  in service from 1866 to 1894.
  was a World War I  launched in 1918 and sold 1934.

References
 

Royal Navy ship names